Dyschirius stenoderus is a species of ground beetle in the subfamily Scaritinae. It was described by Jules Putzeys in 1873.

References

stenoderus
Beetles described in 1873